Braxton Taghvai-Najib (born December 23, 2002) is an American soccer player who plays as a midfielder for MLS Next Pro club Inter Miami CF II.

Career

Youth 
Najib played in the youth academy of Major League Soccer side Real Salt Lake from the under-9 to under-18 levels as well as spending a short time with Orange County sides Pateadores SC and Orange County SC. Taghvai-Najib has also gone on trial in Europe with Sporting Lisbon, Dinamo Zagreb, and other clubs.

Professional 
In July 2020, Najib signed his first professional contract with USL Championship side Birmingham Legion. He made his debut on July 15, 2020, appearing as an 82nd-minute substitute in a 3–0 win over Memphis 901.

In April 2021, Najib joined Major League Soccer club Inter Miami CF and was registered to play for USL League One side Inter Miami CF II for the 2021 season.

References 

2002 births
American soccer players
American people of Iranian descent
Sportspeople of Iranian descent
Association football midfielders
Birmingham Legion FC players
Living people
Soccer players from Utah
USL Championship players
Inter Miami CF II players
MLS Next Pro players